Annabelle Claire Bennett  (born 8 January 1950) is the Chancellor of Bond University and a former Judge of the Federal Court of Australia.

Early life and education
Annabelle Claire Bennett (born Darin) was born in Sydney, Australia, to Emanuel Darin (born Finkelstein) and Raissa Darin (born Atlas).

Bennett's father was a lawyer, and at an early age she had hopes of following him into the legal profession. Her father, however, thought that law was a bad career choice for women, because "you had to be better than the best to break even" and discouraged his daughter from pursuing this ambition. Instead, Bennett studied science at the University of Sydney and completed a Ph.D. in Biochemistry at the same institution.

In 1980, still interested in the legal profession, Bennett went on to study law at the University of New South Wales.

Career
After graduating from the University of New South Wales, Bennett began practising as a barrister, specialising in intellectual property law.

Bennett was appointed to the Federal Court of Australia on 5 May 2003. Bennett was also an additional Judge of the Supreme Court of the Australian Capital Territory and a presidential member of the Administrative Appeals Tribunal. Bennett is arbitrator of the Court of Arbitration for Sport and was named for the special arbitration panel to operate during the 2016 Summer Olympics in Rio de Janeiro. Bennett retired from the Federal Court on 23 March 2016, and now practises as a consultant barrister, mediator and arbitrator at 5 Wentworth.

In April 2016, Bennett became the eighth Chancellor of Bond University in Queensland.

On 20 February 2020, Bennett was appointed as a commissioner to the Royal Commission into National Natural Disaster Arrangements.

In 2022, the Albanese government commissioned an Independent Review of Australian Carbon Credit Units, that reported in December 2022. The independent panel was composed of Professor Ian Chubb AC (Chair), the Hon Dr Annabelle Bennett AC SC, Ms Ariadne Gorring and Dr Stephen Hatfield Dodds.

Awards and honours
Bennett was made an Officer of the Order of Australia in 2005, for "service to the law, particularly in the areas of intellectual property, administrative law and professional conduct; and to the community through a range of educational, medical, women's and business organisations". In 2011, she received the honorary degree of Doctor of the university from the Australian National University. She was upgraded to a Companion of the Order of Australia (AC) in the 2019 Queen's Birthday Honours. In 2016 she received an honorary Doctor of Laws degree from the University of New South Wales. In May 2020 Bennett was elected Fellow of the Australian Academy of Science.

Personal life
Annabelle Bennett is married to David Bennett, the former Commonwealth Solicitor-General and has had three children with him.

Outside of the courtroom, Bennett's interest in biological sciences has continued, and she has been involved in a number of committees, including the Genetic Manipulation Advisory Committee, the Biotechnology Task Force and the Gene Patenting Advisory Committee of the Australian Law Reform Commission. She has also served as a Director of the Sydney Children's Hospital and Neuroscience Research Australia and is a former president of the Australian Academy of Forensic Sciences. In 2012, she was appointed Chair of the National Health and Medical Research Council.

Bennett is also a past President of Chief Executive Women, a former Trustee of the Centennial Park and Moore Park Trust, and was a member of the Reference Group for the APEC Women Leaders' Network Meeting 2007 and the Head of the Australian Delegation to the APEC Women Leaders' Network Meeting 2008 in Peru.

References

 

1950 births
Living people
Judges of the Federal Court of Australia
Australian women judges
University of Sydney alumni
University of New South Wales Law School alumni
Judges of the Supreme Court of the Australian Capital Territory
Officers of the Order of Australia
Companions of the Order of Australia
Recipients of the Centenary Medal
Australian biochemists
Australian women chemists
Australian Jews
Bond University chancellors
Fellows of the Australian Academy of Science